"Lay Your Hands on Me" is a song by American rock band Bon Jovi. It was released on August 1, 1989 as the fourth single from the band's 1988 album New Jersey. It peaked at #7 on the Billboard Hot 100, becoming the band's fourth single from New Jersey to chart in the Top 10 and it also charted at #20 on the Mainstream rock charts.

Music video
The video for this song was culled from performances at the Tacoma Dome in Tacoma, WA and the Memorial Coliseum in Portland, OR during The Jersey Syndicate Tour. It was also released to home video on New Jersey: The Videos and Cross Road: The Videos. The MTV video for "Lay Your Hands On Me" was shot in Salt Lake in May 1989.

In concert
For live performances through the 80s and 90s, Sambora would use a double neck guitar with one neck tuned to drop D and the other tuned to Standard tuning. Examples of this can be seen in the official video clip, as well as in the Live From London DVD. During the 2000s he began using a single-necked guitar, as can be seen in The Crush Tour DVD. The song was performed a few times on the Lost Highway Tour.
During performances on The Circle Tour, the song was performed with Sambora on lead vocals. Since then it has been played regularly on the "This House Is Not For Sale" tour.

This Left Feels Right version
"Lay Your Hands on Me" was re-recorded for 2003's This Left Feels Right album. The new version is in a laid-back acoustic style, featuring Sambora playing the Mandocello as the primary instrument. This version was performed at several concerts on the Have a Nice Day Tour. Though the first acoustic performance of this song was in 1992, from the concert An Evening With Bon Jovi Live in New York.

Cover versions
After hearing the song and thinking it would be a good Gospel song, country singer Dolly Parton called Jon Bon Jovi and Richie Sambora and got permission to turn the song into a Gospel tune for her 2014 album, Blue Smoke. Dolly and Richie performed this cover at Glastonbury on 29 June 2014.

Charts

Weekly charts

Year-end charts

See also
List of glam metal albums and songs

References

Bon Jovi songs
1989 singles
Songs written by Richie Sambora
Songs written by Jon Bon Jovi
Song recordings produced by Bruce Fairbairn
Mercury Records singles
1988 songs
Music videos directed by Wayne Isham
Dolly Parton songs